Simulation theory or Simulation Theory may refer to:

Simulation theory of empathy, theory in philosophy of mind about how people read others' actions and intentions
Simulation Theory (album), 2018 studio album by the English rock band Muse
Simulation hypothesis, theory that all of perceived reality is an artificial simulation
Simulated reality, the hypothesis that reality could be simulated—for example by quantum computer simulation—to a degree indistinguishable from "true" reality.